Peerzadiguda is a satellite city of Hyderabad and municipal corporation located in Medchal-Malkajgiri district in the state of Telangana, India.

It is one of the fastest growing residential areas of Hyderabad.

Government 

Peerzadiguda municipality is the civic body of the town. On 11 April 2016, the gram panchayat of Peerzadiguda was upgraded to Peerzadiguda municipality.

Peerzadiguda is a newly constituted Municipality by merging (3) Grampanchayaths i.e., Peerzadiguda, Medipally and Parvathapur having total population 51,689 as per 2011 census and present projected population is 75,000. Area of the Urban Local body is 10.5 km2 and the total House holds are 23,300.

The geographical Located of Peerzadiguda Municipality is at longitude of 17.3974308 and Latitude 17.3974308.

On 19 July 2019, Peerzadiguda municipality was upgraded to municipal corporation by Telangana government.

References 

Cities and towns in Ranga Reddy district